Lazimpat Durbar, Aka Agni Bhawan is a palace complex in Kathmandu, the capital of the Nepal. Initially build and occupied by Kaji Bir Keshar Pande but later  palace area was occupied by Bir Shumsher JBR, as prime minister the executive head of Nepal. The palace complex, located next to the historic Narayanhity Palace Museum, was incorporated  impressive and vast array of courtyards, gardens and buildings.

History
The palace complex lies in the heart of Kathmandu city, to the north of the bagmati river. The history of the palace is closely linked with the history of Nepal and its rulers.

Under Pandey
As Thapathali was abode of the Thapas, Lazimpat was abode of Pandey. At the time of the Kot massacre on 14 September 1846, Lazimpat Durbar was occupied by Kaji Bir Keshar Pande and was massacred there. After which lazimpat Durbar was occupied by Kaji Mama Col.Tribikram Singh Thapa for 28 years until he left for Varanasi in 1875.

Under Rana

After Kaji Mama Col.Tribikram Singh Thapa left for Kashi in 1875. In 1886 old Lazimpat Durbar was demolished and a new palace was erected by the then Prime minister Bir Shumsher JBR for his brother General Jit Shumsher. As General Jit Shumsher had no one to inherit his property, after his death in 1913 his palace was captured by Juddha Shumsher JBR and gave it to his son Agni Shumsher JBR. After Agni Shumsher's death this palace was sold and later converted into hotel.

Shanker Hotel

After Agni Shumsher's death Lazimpat Durbar (then known as Agni Bhawan) was sold to Ram Shanker Shrestha who remodeled the interior into a historic luxury heritage hotel.

See also
Bir Shumsher JBR
Hotel Shanker
Rana palaces of Nepal

References

Palaces in Nepal
Rana palaces of Nepal
19th-century establishments in Nepal